Butternut Creek can mean any of the following:

 Butternut Creek (Limestone Creek tributary), stream in the greater Syracuse, New York area
 Butternut Creek (Unadilla River tributary), downstream of Mount Upton, New York